Steganotheca is a genus of bushy, probably vascular plants with branched axes, known from upper Silurian strata. It has terminal sporangia and reached 5 cm in height.

References

Prehistoric plant genera
Silurian life